Margaret Clarke RHA (née Crilley; 1 August 1884 – 31 October 1961) was an Irish portrait painter.

Life
Margaret Crilley was born in Newry, County Down, Ireland, on 1 August 1884, one of six children of Patrick Crilley. Her date of birth is often given as 29 July 1888, though local records do not support this, suggesting she was born four years earlier. Having initially trained at Newry technical school with her sister Mary intending to become a teacher, in 1905, Margaret won a scholarship to attend the Dublin Metropolitan School of Art. There she studied under William Orpen, who regarded her as one of his most promising students. She completed her studies in 1911 attaining an Art Teacher's Certificate, and began working as Orpen's assistant.

In 1914, Margaret married her fellow student Harry Clarke, much to the surprise of their family and acquaintances. The couple moved into a flat at 33 North Frederick Street. They had three children, Michael, David and Ann. Harry's brother, Walter, married Margaret's sister, Mary, in 1915. 

Clarke became the director of the Harry Clarke Stained Glass Studios following the death of her husband in 1931. She died thirty years later in Dublin on 31 October 1961, and is buried in the Redford cemetery, Greystones, County Wicklow. She is commemorated with a blue plaque at her birthplace in Newry.

Artistic work

Clarke first exhibited with the Royal Hibernian Academy in 1913, and would go on to exhibit over 60 artworks in the forty years until 1953, the majority being portraits. Amongst the portrait commissions Clarke received were ones for Dermod O'Brien, President Éamon de Valera, Archbishop McQuaid, and Lennox Robinson. Clarke spent a great deal of time on the Aran Islands with  fellow artist Seán Keating and her husband, from which she produced a number of landscapes and smaller studies.

A critic noted in 1939 that Clarke produced "remarkable drawings in which individuality is caught in a few swift economical lines." Over her lifetime Clarke won many awards including the Tailteann gold, silver and bronze medals in 1924, and another Tailteann bronze in both 1928 and 1932. She was elected an Associate of the Royal Hibernian Academy (ARHA) in 1926, and a full RHA in 1927. Upon the founding of the Irish Exhibition of Living Art in 1943, she was appointed a member of the executive committee. Her work can be found in the collections of the National Gallery of Ireland, The Hugh Lane, the Crawford Art Gallery, the Ulster Museum, Limerick City Gallery of Art, The National Self Portrait Collection, and the Irish College in Rome.

Exhibitions
The exhibition at National Gallery of Ireland in 2017 reevaluated Margaret Clarke's great artistic reputation.

References

External links

1880s births
1961 deaths
Irish portrait painters
People from Newry
People associated with University College Cork
Arts and Crafts movement artists
Alumni of the National College of Art and Design
Irish women painters
20th-century Irish painters
20th-century Irish women artists